Deidre Ann Watkinson (born 1941), is a female former athlete who competed for England.

Athletics career
Watkinson was selected by England to represent her country in athletics events.

She represented England and won a silver medal in the 440 yards, at the 1966 British Empire and Commonwealth Games in Kingston, Jamaica.

References

1941 births
English female sprinters
Commonwealth Games medallists in athletics
Commonwealth Games silver medallists for England
Athletes (track and field) at the 1966 British Empire and Commonwealth Games
Living people
Medallists at the 1966 British Empire and Commonwealth Games